Reuteria is a genus of plant bugs in the family Miridae. There are about 15 described species in Reuteria.

Species
These 15 species belong to the genus Reuteria:

References

Further reading

External links

 

Miridae genera
Articles created by Qbugbot
Orthotylini